"Where I Belong" is the fourth Japanese single by French-Canadian singer Himeka and the first single released under her new label Mages. The single was scheduled to be released on October 24, 2012. "Where I Belong" is the ending theme song for the TV program .

Track list

References

2012 singles
2012 songs
Sony Music Entertainment Japan singles